José Javier Abella Fanjul (born 10 February 1994) is a Mexican professional footballer who plays as a right-back for Liga MX club Atlas.

Club career
Abella made his Liga MX debut with Santos Laguna 26 July 2013 in a 3–2 home game win against Cruz Azul.

International career
In early 2018, media sources claimed Abella could have possibly represented the Lebanon national team if he was not to be called by Mexico.

In September 2018, Abella was called up by Mexico head coach Ricardo Ferretti for two friendly matches against Uruguay and the United States. On 11 September 2018, he made his senior debut against the United States, where Mexico lost 0–1.

Personal life
Abella and Mexican international footballer Miguel Layún are second cousins, as their Mexican grandmothers are sisters, sharing a great-grandparent in common.

Career statistics

International

Honours
Santos Laguna
Liga MX: Clausura 2015, Clausura 2018
Copa MX: Apertura 2014

Atlas
Liga MX: Apertura 2021, Clausura 2022
Campeón de Campeones: 2022

Mexico Youth
CONCACAF U-20 Championship: 2013
Pan American Silver Medal: 2015

Individual
Toulon Tournament top scorer: 2013

References

External links 

 
 
 
 
 
 
 
 

1994 births
Living people
Association football forwards
Mexico under-20 international footballers
Mexican people of Lebanese descent
Footballers from Veracruz
Sportspeople from Córdoba, Veracruz
Atlas F.C. footballers
Liga MX players
Santos Laguna footballers
Footballers at the 2015 Pan American Games
Footballers at the 2016 Summer Olympics
Olympic footballers of Mexico
Pan American Games medalists in football
Pan American Games silver medalists for Mexico
Mexican footballers
Medalists at the 2015 Pan American Games
Sportspeople of Lebanese descent